The 1976 NCAA Division I Soccer Tournament was the eighteenth organized men's college soccer tournament by the National Collegiate Athletic Association, to determine the top college soccer team in the United States. The final match was played at Franklin Field in Philadelphia, Pennsylvania on December 5, 1976.

San Francisco won their third national title, and second consecutive, by defeating Indiana in the championship game, 1–0.

Tournament bracket

Championship Rounds

Third-Place Final

Final

See also  
 1976 NCAA Division II Soccer Championship
 1976 NCAA Division III Soccer Championship
 1976 NAIA Soccer Championship

References 

1976 NCAA Division I soccer season
NCAA Division I Men's Soccer Tournament seasons
NCAA Division I Men's
NCAA Division I Men's Soccer Tournament
NCAA Division I Men's Soccer Tournament